Francis Pilkington (ca. 1565 – 1638) was an English classical composer, lutenist and singer, of the Renaissance and Baroque period. Pilkington received a B.Mus. degree from Oxford in 1595. In 1602 he became a singing man at Chester Cathedral and spent the rest of his life serving the cathedral. He became a minor canon in 1612, took holy orders in 1614 and was named precentor of the cathedral in 1623. Although he was a churchman, Pilkington composed largely secular music—ayres, madrigals, and lute songs.  He died in Chester.

Sources
Brief biographical sketch of Francis Pilkington in the Grove Concise Dictionary of Music, 1994, Oxford University Press.

External links

1560s births
1638 deaths
English classical composers
Renaissance composers
English Baroque composers
English lutenists
Alumni of the University of Oxford
16th-century English composers
17th-century English composers
17th-century classical composers
English male classical composers
17th-century male musicians